The first season of Numbers, an American television series, premiered on January 23, 2005 and finished on May 13, 2005. The first season sees the start of the working relationship between Don Eppes, an FBI agent, and his genius brother Charlie, an applied mathematician and professor at a local university. The rest of Don's FBI team consists of Terry Lake and David Sinclair. Don and Charlie's father, Alan Eppes, provides emotional support for the pair, while the brilliant Professor Larry Fleinhardt and promising doctoral student Amita Ramanujan provide mathematical support and insights to Charlie.

Cast

Main 
 Rob Morrow as Don Eppes
 David Krumholtz as Charlie Eppes
 Judd Hirsch as Alan Eppes
 Alimi Ballard as David Sinclair
 Sabrina Lloyd as Terry Lake
 Peter MacNicol as Larry Fleinhardt

Recurring 
 Navi Rawat as Amita Ramanujan
 Lou Diamond Phillips as Ian Edgerton

Guest 
 CCH Pounder as Lt. Havercamp
 J. K. Simmons as Dr. Clarence Weaver
 Alyson Reed as Eva Salton
 Neil Patrick Harris as Ethan Burdick
 Susan Egan as Becky Burdick
 Sarah Wayne Callies as Agent Kim Hall
 Molly Hagan as Fingerprint Technician
 Carrie Preston as Vicky Sites
 Joseph Gordon-Levitt as Scott Reynolds
 Stacy Edwards as Gail Hoke
 Gloria Reuben as Erica Quimby
 Jennifer Westfeldt as Dr. Karen Fisher
 Rainn Wilson as Martin Grolsch

Episodes

References

External links 
 

1
2005 American television seasons
1